Peter Pasetti (1916–1996) was a German stage, television and film actor. He played a number of leading roles in post-Second World War productions such as the operetta film A Night in Venice (1953). From the late 1950s he appeared increasingly on television.

Filmography

Film
 The Girl from Barnhelm (1940) - 2. Offizier
 Venus on Trial (1941) - Pg. Pasetti (uncredited)
 Der Herr vom andern Stern (1948) - Minister
 Die kupferne Hochzeit (1948) - Per
 Du bist nicht allein (1949) - Michael Dieffenbach
  (1950) - Hans Wiegler
 Sensation in San Remo (1951) - Valenta
 Homesick for You (1952) - Kurt Hellwig
 A Night in Venice (1953) - Coramello
 Open Your Window (1953)
 Jonny Saves Nebrador (1953) - Lt. Col. Dacano
 The Red Prince (1954) - Johann Orth
 Dein Mund verspricht mir Liebe (1954) - Dr. Peter Waldenegg
 Girl with a Future (1954) - Achmed Spiro
 Clivia (1954) - Juan
 Three from Variety (1954)
 Verliebte Leute (1954) - Manfred Böttcher, Ingenieur
 Der Frontgockel (1955) - Oberleutnant von Flitsch, Flieger
 Spielbank-Affäre (1957) - Dr. Busch
 Time of the Innocent (1964)
 The Pacifist (1970) - Commissario
 Und Jimmy ging zum Regenbogen (1971) - Fedor Santarin
  (1977) - Gaspardi
 Smaragd (1987) - Siggi Ronca

Television
 The Time Has Come (1960, TV series) - Lwawrence Hudson
 Am grünen Strand der Spree (1960, TV miniseries) - Peter Koslowski / Ettore da Babiena
 Spätere Heirat erwünscht (1966) - Harald Baum
 Alexander Zwo (1973, TV miniseries) - Anthony Baxter
 Derrick (several episodes of the long running police detective TV series)
 Teufels Großmutter (1986, TV series) - F. H. Heindl

References

Bibliography 
 Goble, Alan. The Complete Index to Literary Sources in Film. Walter de Gruyter, 1999.

External links 
 

1916 births
1996 deaths
German male television actors
German male stage actors
German male film actors
Male actors from Munich
20th-century German male actors
Deaths from cancer in Germany